It is a 1986 horror novel by American author Stephen King. It was his 22nd book and his 17th novel written under his own name. The story follows the experiences of seven children as they are terrorized by an evil entity that exploits the fears of its victims to disguise itself while hunting its prey. "It" primarily appears in the form of Pennywise the Dancing Clown to attract its preferred prey of young children.

The novel is told through narratives alternating between two periods and is largely told in the third-person omniscient mode. It deals with themes that eventually became King staples: the power of memory, childhood trauma and its recurrent echoes in adulthood, the malevolence lurking beneath the idyllic façade of the American small town, and overcoming evil through mutual trust and sacrifice.

King has stated that he first conceived the story in 1978, and began writing it in 1981. He finished writing the book in 1985. He also stated that he originally wanted the title character to be a troll, like the one in the children's story "Three Billy Goats Gruff", who inhabited the local sewer system rather than just the area beneath one bridge. He also wanted the piece to interweave the stories of children and the adults they later become.

The novel won the British Fantasy Award in 1987, and received nominations for the Locus and World Fantasy Awards that same year. Publishers Weekly listed It as the best-selling hardcover fiction book in the United States in 1986. It has been adapted into a 1990 two-part miniseries directed by Tommy Lee Wallace, a Hindi 1998 television series directed by Glen Baretto & Ankush Mohla, and a film duology directed by Andy Muschietti. Muschietti's It was released in September 2017 and It Chapter Two was released in September 2019.

Plot

1957–1958
During a rainstorm in Derry, Maine, a six-year-old boy named Georgie Denbrough sails a paper boat along the rainy streets before it washes down into a storm drain. Looking in the drain, Georgie encounters a clown who introduces himself as Pennywise the Dancing Clown. Georgie, despite knowing he should not talk to strangers, is enticed by Pennywise to reach into the drain and retrieve his boat. It then rips his arm off, and Georgie disappears.

The following June, an overweight eleven-year-old boy named Ben Hanscom is harassed by a bully named Henry Bowers and his gang on the last day of school, escaping into the marshy wasteland known as the Barrens. There, Ben befriends an asthmatic hypochondriac named Eddie Kaspbrak and "Stuttering Bill" Denbrough, Georgie's elder brother. The three boys later befriend fellow misfits Richie Tozier, Stanley "Stan" Uris, and Beverly Marsh, and refer to themselves as "The Losers Club". As the summer draws on, the Losers each encounter Pennywise in terrifying manifestations: a mummy on a frozen canal to Ben, a fountain of blood (that only children can see) from Beverly's sink, a rotting leper to Eddie, drowned corpses to Stan, and a frightening phantom of Georgie to Bill. Meanwhile, an increasingly unhinged and sadistic Bowers begins focusing his attention on his African-American neighbor, Mike Hanlon, and his father. Bowers kills Mike's dog and chases the terrified boy into the Barrens, where he joins the Losers in driving Bowers' gang off in a rock fight, leaving a humiliated Bowers to vow for revenge. Mike becomes a member of the Losers Club after revealing his own encounter with Pennywise in the form of a flesh-eating bird. From Mike's historical scrapbook, the Losers realize that "It" is an ancient monster with a hold on the town. Following further encounters, the Losers construct a makeshift smoke hole that Richie and Mike use to hallucinate It's origins as an ancient alien entity that came to Earth, beginning a cycle of feeding on children for a year followed by a 27-year-long hibernation.

Soon, Eddie is hospitalized by Bowers and several of his friends, and Beverly witnesses one of the bullies, Patrick Hockstetter, kidnapped by It in the form of a mass of flying leeches. The Losers discover a message from It in Patrick's blood, warning them that It will kill them if they interfere. In hopes that silver can wound It, Ben makes two silver slugs out of a silver dollar, and the Losers enter an abandoned house where Eddie, Bill, and Richie had previously encountered It to attempt to kill It. They manage to wound It with the silver while It is in the form of a werewolf. Deeming the Losers a threat, It manipulates Bowers into murdering his abusive father and chasing the Losers into the sewers to kill them, where his accompanying fellow bullies, Victor "Vic" Criss and Reginald "Belch" Huggins, are both killed by It. This leads Bowers to become lost in the sewers, traumatized. 

In the sewers, Bill performs the "Ritual of Chüd" in an attempt to face It in the Macroverse, the alternate universe where It is from, where he meets the monster's antithesis Maturin, an ancient turtle that created the universe. Bill learns that It can only be defeated during a battle of wills, and sees It's true form, the "Deadlights", before Bill defeats the monster with Maturin's help. After the battle, not knowing if they killed It or not, the Losers get lost in the sewers. To try and regain a sense of direction, Beverly has intercourse with each of the boys to bring the unity back to the group. Once they are safely out, the Losers swear a blood oath to return to Derry should It resurface. Bowers, having lost his sanity by the time he washed out of the sewers into a nearby river, is institutionalized after being blamed for the town's child murders.

1984–1985 
In July 1984, three youths brutally attack a young gay man named Adrian Mellon and throw him off a bridge, where both a bully and Adrian's boyfriend see a clown then appear. Adrian is found mutilated, and the teenagers are arrested and charged with his murder. 

When a string of violent child killings begins in Derry again, an adult Mike Hanlon, now the town's librarian, calls up the six former members of the Losers Club to remind them of their childhood promise to return if the killings start again. Bill is now a successful horror writer living with his actress wife, Audra; Beverly is a fashion designer, married to an abusive man named Tom Rogan; Eddie runs a limousine rental company and has married a hysterical codependent woman similar to his hypochondriac mother; Richie Tozier is a disc jockey; Ben Hanscom is now thin and a successful, but lonely, architect; and Stan Uris is a wealthy accountant. Prior to Mike's phone calls, all of the Losers had completely forgotten each other and the trauma of their childhood, burying the horror of their encounters with It. All of the Losers agree to return to Derry, except for Stan, who kills himself in terror of facing It again.

The Losers meet for lunch, where Mike reminds them that It awakens roughly every 27 years for 12–16 months at a time, feeding on children before going into slumber again. The group decides to kill It once and for all. At Mike's suggestion, each person explores different parts of Derry to help restore their memories. While exploring, Eddie, Richie, Beverly, and Ben are faced with manifestations of It (Eddie as Belch Huggins and childhood friends in leper and zombified forms, Richie as a Paul Bunyan statue, Beverly as the witch from Hansel & Gretel in her childhood home, and Ben as Dracula in the Derry Library). Bill finds his childhood bicycle, "Silver," and brings it to Mike's. In the meantime, Audra, who is worried about Bill, travels to Derry; Tom arrives as well, intending to kill Beverly; and Henry Bowers escapes from the mental asylum with help from It. 

Henry confronts Mike at the library, but Mike escapes alive. It instructs Henry to kill the rest of the Losers, but Henry is killed while attacking Eddie. It then appears to Tom and orders him to capture Audra, bringing Audra to It's lair, where Audra becomes catatonic, and Tom drops dead in shock. Bill, Ben, Beverly, Richie, and Eddie learn that Mike is near death and realize they are being forced into another confrontation with It. They descend into the sewers and use their strength as a group to "send energy" to a hospitalized Mike, who fights off a nurse that is under the control of It. They reach It's lair and find that It has taken the form of a giant spider. Bill and Richie enter It's mind through the Ritual of Chüd, but they get lost in It. Eddie injures It by spraying his asthma medication down It's throat, but It bites off Eddie's arm, killing him. It runs away to tend to its injuries, but Bill, Richie, and Ben chase after and find that It has laid eggs. Ben stays behind to destroy the eggs, while Bill and Richie head toward their final confrontation with It. Bill fights his way inside It's body, locates It's heart, and destroys it. The group meets up to head out of It's lair, and although they try to bring Audra and Eddie's bodies with them, they are forced to leave Eddie behind. They realize that the scars on their hands from their blood pact have disappeared, indicating that their ordeal is finally over.

At the same time, the worst storm in Maine's history sweeps through Derry, and the downtown area collapses. Mike concludes that Derry is finally dying. The Losers return home and gradually begin to forget about It, Derry, and each other all over again. Mike's memory of the events of that summer also begins to fade, as well as any of the records he had written down previously, much to his relief, and he considers starting a new life elsewhere. Ben and Beverly leave together and become a couple, and Richie returns to California. Bill is the last to leave Derry. Before he goes, he takes Audra, still catatonic, for a ride on Silver, which awakens her from her catatonia, and they share a kiss.

Characters

The Losers Club 
The Losers Club is a group of seven eleven-year-old misfit children who are united by their unhappy lives. They share the same misery and torment from being the victims of a gang of local bullies led by the increasingly sociopathic Henry Bowers and band together as they struggle to overcome It. The seven children find themselves caught up in a nefarious situation, which they cannot quite comprehend but against which they must fight.

 William "Bill" Denbrough Bill is the leader and most self-assured member of the Losers Club as well as the main protagonist of the story. Feeling responsible for Georgie's death, he seeks revenge on the monster. His parents have become cold and withdrawn towards him after the loss of their youngest son, and he secretly hopes the death of the murderer will awaken his parents to his presence again. He has a severe stutter, which has earned him the nickname "Stuttering Bill". His mother attributes the stutter to a car accident that occurred when he was three years old, but his stutter is implied to be psychosomatic rather than physical: it worsens considerably after Georgie's death, and fades during his teenage years entirely, returning suddenly when Bill returns to Derry in 1985. He is the most determined and resourceful of the Losers, although his leadership among them is unofficial. It is Bill who eventually destroys It, engaging It in the Ritual of Chüd in both 1958 and 1985, and eventually killing It's physical form by ripping its heart out. As an adult, he becomes a successful writer and marries film star Audra Phillips, who bears a strong resemblance to Beverly.
 Benjamin "Ben" Hanscom Known as "Haystack" to his friends, Ben is a highly intelligent boy who, before joining the Losers Club, often spent his free time reading books at the public library. Due to childhood obesity, he was the favorite victim of Henry Bowers, but later sheds the weight as an adult. His mechanical skills prove useful to the Losers, from making two silver slugs to building an underground clubhouse, and later contribute to his success as an internationally renowned architect. He develops a crush on Beverly Marsh as a child and the two leave Derry together after the 1985 defeat of It.
 Beverly "Bev" Marsh Beverly is an attractive and tomboyish redhead on whom each of the boys has a secret crush at some point during the story. She is the only girl in the group and comes from the poorest part of Derry. During her childhood, she is frequently abused by her father, Alvin, while her mother, Elfrida, is out working. As an adult, she becomes a successful fashion designer in Chicago, but endures several abusive relationships, culminating in her marriage to Tom Rogan, who sees her as an object of sex and frequently beats her. Following the destruction of It, she leaves Derry with Ben.
 Richard "Richie" Tozier Known as "Trashmouth", Richie is the Losers' self-appointed comic relief, always cracking jokes and doing impersonations or "voices", which prove to be a very powerful weapon against It. He is "too intelligent for his own good", which frequently leads to trouble. He is the most devoted to keeping the group together, as he sees seven as a magical number and believes the group should have no more, no less. In adulthood, he is a successful disc jockey in Los Angeles. As the DJ, he uses his once-annoying and unrealistic voices as one of his main attractions. He is extremely nearsighted and wears thick glasses as a child, but changes to contact lenses as an adult. He loses his contact lenses in an encounter with It and is forced to return to his glasses, one of several ways the Losers return to their childhood. Although it is unclear if he was the basis of the character's name and occupation, Maine Public Radio has a music program hosted by a Rich Tozier.
 Edward "Eddie" Kaspbrak Eddie is a frail and asthmatic hypochondriac, who carries his inhaler with him everywhere. His father died when he was very young, and his mother is domineering and constantly worries about his health. Later in the story, it is revealed that Eddie's asthma is psychosomatic: the pharmacist has been giving him water instead of medicine in his inhaler. The root of Eddie's problems is his mother, who has Munchausen syndrome by proxy. Her constant worrying about his health has been a way to manipulate him into caring for her. When Henry and his friends break his arm, his mother tries to prevent the Losers from visiting Eddie in the hospital and he finally stands up to her, telling her he is not as helpless as she thinks. As an adult, he runs a successful limousine business in New York City and is married to Myra, who is very similar to his mother. In his return to Derry as an adult, he also finds the strength to defend himself from Henry Bowers, killing him with a broken bottle. In the altercation, he re-breaks his arm in the same spot as he did as a child. When facing It in the sewers, his arm is bitten off and he bleeds to death, ultimately dying in his friends' arms.
 Michael "Mike" Hanlon Mike is the last to join the Losers. He is the only African-American in the group and lives with his parents on a large farm. He goes to a different school from the other kids due to his Baptist faith. Mike is racially persecuted by Henry Bowers, whose father holds a long-standing grudge against Mike's father. Mike meets the Losers when they help him fight back against Bowers in a massive rock fight. His father kept an album filled with photos that were important to Derry's history, including several of Pennywise the Dancing Clown. He is the only one of the Losers to stay behind in Derry (and thus the only one to retain his memory of the events of 1958) and becomes the town librarian. He researches Derry's history and It, and is the one who beckons the others back when the killings begin again in 1985. Though he survives, Mike is seriously wounded by Henry and is unable to join the remaining Losers (Bill, Ben, Bev, Eddie, and Richie) in the final battle against It. He later recovers from his wounds but, like the others, starts to lose his memory of the experience. It was later revealed in Insomnia that Mike continued as a librarian and was the boss of one of that book's primary characters in 1993.
 Stanley "Stan" Uris Stan is the most skeptical member of the Club. He is Jewish and is persecuted by Henry Bowers for this reason. Logic, order, and cleanliness are deeply ingrained in his psyche. He relies on logic more than anything else and is the least willing to accept that It actually exists. As an adult, he becomes a partner in a large Atlanta-based accounting firm and marries Patty Blum, a teacher. Upon receiving Mike's phone call in 1985, he commits suicide by slitting his wrists in the bathtub and writing "IT" in his blood on the wall. It is heavily implied that Stan was the only one aware that It was not only female but was also pregnant, hence he chose death over returning to Derry to face the ancient terror, despite being the one to slice the Losers' palms in a blood oath. It is also implied in the book that Stan remembers more about the children's encounters with It than the others do, sometimes commenting on the Turtle and other events from his time in Derry, though he claims that he doesn't remember what those phrases mean. It can be inferred throughout the story that he was psychic to a mild degree (accurately predicting which job his wife should apply for, a higher sensitivity to Its activities, frequent references from the other Losers to his "ordered mind"). Besides blaming It for Georgie's death, Bill also blames It for Stan's death.

Pennywise/It 

Described as a mysterious, eldritch, demonic entity of evil, It is a monster of unknown origin that preys on Derry's children and humans every twenty-seven years. IT finds striking fear in children akin to seasoning or "salt(ing) the meat", "You all taste so much better when you are afraid". Among It's powers is shapeshifting into a form that tricks its victims and induce fear, but usually It takes the form of a middle-aged man dressed in a clown costume, calling itself "Pennywise the Dancing Clown" and occasionally Bob or Robert Gray, modeled after Bozo, Clarabell, and Ronald McDonald. However, It's truest form, as perceived by the human eye, is that of a giant female spider that houses It's essence: writhing orange lights (termed "Deadlights"), looking directly into which can render a person catatonic or even kill them. 

It can manipulate people and use them as pawns in doing its bidding, either by assuming a form familiar to them, promising them their desires or through subliminal influence. Because of this control over what happens in Derry, many of the child murders It commits are never solved; the adults of Derry act as though either nothing is happening or they have forgotten about It.

It's awakenings from hibernation mark the greatest known instances of violence in Derry, such as the disappearance of over three hundred settlers from Derry Township in 1740–43. In 1957, It awoke during a great storm which flooded part of the city, whereupon It went on a feeding spree, starting by murdering Georgie Denbrough. However, the Losers Club forced It to return to an early hibernation when heavily wounded by the young Bill Denbrough in the first Ritual of Chüd. As the story opens, It has awakened approximately 27 years later and is first seen when three bullies beat up a homosexual couple, Adrian Mellon and Don Hagarty. It kills Adrian after the bullies throw him off a bridge. 

When the adult members of the Losers Club gather, It recognizes them as a threat and resolves to drive them away both through illusions and by controlling Henry Bowers, the Losers' long-time childhood bully. Bill, Richie, Beverly, Eddie, and Ben manage to confront It's spider form after It possesses Audra. It is finally destroyed in the second Ritual of Chüd, and an enormous storm damages the downtown part of Derry to signify It's death. 
In King's subsequent 2001 novel Dreamcatcher, Mr. Gray cannot put a worm in Derry's water supply by use of the Standpipe, as it is no longer there due to the 1985 flood. In its place is a memorial featuring a cast-bronze statue of two children and a plaque underneath, dedicated to the victims of the 1985 flood and of It. The plaque has been vandalized with graffiti reading, "PENNYWISE LIVES".

The character has been named by several outlets as one of the scariest clowns in film or pop culture.

The Bowers Gang

The Bowers Gang is a group of seven twelve-year-old neighborhood bullies who attend the same school as and are the worst enemies of the Losers Club after It. The gang is led by the crazed and mischievous Henry Bowers, while also being co-led by Henry's two best friends and sidekicks, the smarter and more moral Victor "Vic" Criss and the unusually larger, stronger, and more slow-witted Reginald "Belch" Huggins. Although the fates of three of them (Peter Gordon, Steve "Moose" Sadler, Gard Jagermeyer) were never made official, it is stated in the novel that the remaining child murders during the summer of 1958 after that of minor character Jimmy Cullum were of all of Henry's friends, creating the assumption that they were attacked and killed by It (possibly as means to worsen Henry's sociopathism).

 Henry Bowers Henry Bowers is the sadistic and crazed leader of the Bowers Gang who torments the Losers and other kids ceaselessly before and throughout the summer of 1958. The novel portrays him as a hateful and violent twelve-year-old boy filled with mischief and malice. Henry's sanity slowly deteriorates throughout the summer due to the influence of It and abuse from his equally crazy and abusive father, Butch Bowers, who has taught Henry to be a racist. Henry shares his father's intense hatred for the Hanlon family, the only black family in Derry, in addition to being a sexist and anti-semite. He inflicts many acts of cruelty and humiliation upon the Losers during and before the summer of '58, such as attempting to carve his name onto Ben Hanscom's stomach (though he only gets as far as the first letter), ceaselessly mocking Bill Denbrough's pronounced stutter, harassing Beverly and threatening her with sexual violence, killing Mike Hanlon's dog and bathing Mike in mud to make him a "tar baby", breaking Eddie Kaspbrak's arm, pursuing Richie Tozier through town, and white-washing Stan Uris' face in snow until it bleeds. His deteriorating sanity becomes apparent during his attacks on Eddie and Beverly: with the former, he pushed Mr. Gedreau to the ground and threatened him into going back inside the Tracker Bros. Store when the man tried to stand up for Eddie after Henry starts attacking Eddie with gravel; he kicked out an old lady's taillight when she tried to stand up for Beverly. After a violent rock fight in early July, Henry becomes increasingly sadistic until he eventually murders his father in mid-August with a switchblade provided by It, and also tries to kill the Losers. He chases them into the town sewers with his friends Vic Criss and Belch Huggins, only to encounter It in the form of Frankenstein's monster, who decapitates Vic and mutilates Belch's face. Henry fails to kill any of the Losers and manages to escape from It. When he eventually finds his way out of the sewers, the shock of witnessing his friends being slaughtered has driven him completely insane. He is convicted of the murder of his father and is framed for most of It's murders throughout the summer. He is placed in an insane asylum and remains there until May 29, 1985, when he escapes with It's assistance, and heads back to Derry to attempt to murder the Losers once more. After critically wounding Mike in the town library and being injured himself in the process, Henry then goes to the hotel where most of the Losers are staying, and finds Eddie's room first, only to be killed in the confrontation by Eddie.
 Victor "Vic" Criss Vic Criss is a bully, and one of Henry's sidekicks. Among Henry's gang, Vic is most likely the smartest and most intelligent member and is the only one who truly realizes Henry's insanity, and becomes increasingly reluctant to follow him. The novel describes Vic as having good morals despite helping Henry torment the Losers, often wanting to scare or intimidate the Losers rather than actually cause physical harm. When he makes comments and jokes, he often uses heavy profanity as well as implied or explicit violence. It is also noted that he is a more than fair pitcher during the rock fight, where he causes the most damage (partly and somewhat paradoxically because he did not want to be there). In early August, while in the Tracker Brothers store, Vic warns the Losers of Henry's deteriorating sanity. He also almost approaches the Losers to join them but decides against it. By doing this, he seals his fate and joins Henry and Belch in following the Losers into the sewers, where the three encounter It in the form of Frankenstein's monster, who kills Vic by decapitating him. Later It appears before Henry taking the form of Vic and Henry continually remembers Vic's decapitation. His corpse along with Belch's is later discovered by the adult Losers when they go to face It for the final time.
 Reginald "Belch" Huggins Belch Huggins is the other sidekick of Henry's, and earned his nickname due to his ability to belch on command. He is very big for his age, being six feet tall at twelve years old. Belch is considered stupid by most people, which he makes up for in physical strength and his fierce loyalty to his friends, especially Henry. He is believed to be a professional grade baseball batter. Belch follows Henry and Vic into the sewers to murder the Losers, only to encounter It in the form of Frankenstein's monster. After It kills Vic and goes after Henry, Belch defends him and attacks It. Henry leaves Belch behind and It overpowers him and kills him by mutilating his face. It appears as a mutilated Belch to drive Henry to the hotel where the Losers are staying. During this encounter, Belch shows a great deal of resentment towards Henry, which uneases Henry. His corpse along with Vic's is later discovered by the adult Losers when they go to face It for the final time.
 Patrick Hockstetter Patrick Hockstetter is a psychopathic and solipsistic bully who is part of Henry's gang (despite his generally low reputation, even as a bully). Patrick keeps a pencil box full of dead flies, which he kills with his ruler, and shows it to other students. Even though he is still so young he had committed multiple crimes such as stalking, sexual assault, theft, rape, animal cruelty, fratricide, infanticide, child murder, assault and arson. He makes sexual advances to Henry at one point, likely being in love with him. He also takes small, usually injured animals and locks them in a broken refrigerator in a junkyard, and leaves them there to die. Along with killing animals, Patrick has also murdered his infant brother, Avery, by suffocation when he was five years old. When alone with Henry after lighting farts with him and his gang one July afternoon in 1958, Patrick gives Henry a handjob and offers to give him oral sex, which snaps Henry out of his daze and prompts him to punch Patrick in the mouth. Henry then reveals that he knows about Patrick's refrigerator, and threatens to tell everyone about it if Patrick tells about the handjob. Once Henry has left, Patrick opens the refrigerator to dispose of the animal corpses but is attacked by a swarm of flying leeches, his only fear. The swarm sucks Patrick's blood leaving large holes all over his body, which causes him to slowly lose consciousness as he is dragged away by It. When he awakens, It begins to feed on him. His death is witnessed by Beverly, and his corpse is discovered by the Losers when they go into the sewers to face It for the first time.
 Peter Gordon A well-off friend of Henry's that lives on West Broadway, who thinks of chasing Mike Hanlon as a game, though Henry's crazed and increasingly violent behavior (such as attempting to outright kill Mike with cherry bombs and M-80s) begins to alienate him. He is also the boyfriend of an unattractive girl with heavy acne named Marcia Fadden. When school goes out for the summer, Peter (menacingly) invites Ben Hanscom to play baseball with him and while on a date with Marcia, he insults the Losers at the movies. Like Vic Criss, he also realizes Henry's eroding sanity, albeit only after the rock fight. He is never seen again after the rock fight. 
 Steve "Moose" Sadler A slightly developmentally disabled and very slow friend of Henry's, whose father works on the Hanlon family farm. He joins Henry in tormenting Mike Hanlon and also helps him break Eddie's arm in the park. However, Moose is shown to be more of a minion or a follower to Henry rather than a friend and is more of a friend to Vic and Belch.
 Gard Jagermeyer A very slow and dumb friend of Henry's. He once pushed Richie Tozier to the ground, breaking his glasses. Aside from this instance, Gard is mentioned a few times throughout the novel, arguably making him the most minor of Henry's gang.

Other characters
 George Elmer Denbrough More commonly known as "Georgie". The first character introduced in the book. He is the six-year-old brother of Bill Denbrough, and he goes out to sail his boat made from a sheet of newspaper only for it to be swept into a storm drain. Seconds later Pennywise appears and tempts him with balloons and circus food. Georgie says no and as Georgie reaches for the boat, Pennywise grabs him and rips his arm off, whispering to him "they float" while he bleeds to death.
 Eddie Corcoran Eddie Corcoran is a classmate of the Losers Club and Henry's gang. Like Beverly Marsh, Eddie and his younger brother Dorsey are victims of child abuse by their stepfather, Richard Macklin. Eddie's stepfather would often beat both boys brutally and without warning, at one point throwing Eddie into a coat rack with enough force to make him urinate blood for two weeks for accidentally slamming the door while Macklin was sleeping. In May 1957, Macklin hit Dorsey in the back of the head with a hammer, accidentally killing him, which he covered up to look like an accident. Two days before summer vacation in June 1958, Eddie runs away from home and decides to rest in the park. However, using Dorsey's form, It approaches Eddie and chases after him before assuming the form of the Gill-man to kill him. Eddie is the only child who is actually shown getting killed by It besides George Denbrough and Patrick Hockstetter.
 Adrian Mellon Adrian Mellon is a young homosexual man in Derry. He grows fond of the town, despite its violently homophobic mindset, and only agrees to leave to please his partner, Don Hagarty. Before leaving, however, the two attend a town fair in July 1984, and on the way home, they are harassed by three gay-hating youths. The three attack them, Adrian especially because of a hat he won at the fair, and throw him from a bridge over a canal. When he hits the bottom, Adrian is attacked by Pennywise as It briefly pressured his ribs until he shrieked, and dragged him away to kill. Though Don and one of the bullies, Chris Unwin, witnessed this, no mention of Pennywise is made at the trial.
 Will Hanlon Will Hanlon is the father of Mike Hanlon. While dying of cancer in 1962, he tells Mike about his experiences in the Army Air Corps in the 1920s and about establishing the Black Spot, a club started by Will and his black Air Force buddies and originally meant exclusively for black members, but gradually began accepting members of other races as well. He recounts how, in the fall of 1930, the club was burned down by a group of Maine Legion of White Decency members, causing numerous deaths. He narrowly survived the fire due to the intervention of his friend Dick Hallorann, a character who also appears in King's The Shining.  He also tells Mike that he witnessed a giant bird - the same bird that nearly killed Mike in 1958 — carry off a Legion of White Decency member and fly away with him in its talons.
 Norbert Keene The owner and operator of the Center Street Drug Store for fifty years, from 1925 to 1975. The Losers dislike him, thinking of him as cruel and snide. He administers Eddie's asthma medication and later reveals to him, for unclear motives, that it is only a placebo ordered by his mother.  Many years later, when Keene is 85 and retired, Mike interviews him, and Mr. Keene tells him the story of the Bradley Gang, a group of outlaws who were hiding out in Maine after several bank robberies in the Midwest.  He tells Mike that, in 1929, a year before the fire at the Black Spot, the entire gang was murdered by Derry residents when stopping through town to buy ammunition. Mr. Keene says that, rather than covering up the event, the whole town instead pretended that it never occurred, including police chief Jim Sullivan, who even took part in the slayings. Finally, Mr. Keene mentions seeing a clown participating in the shooting, but that it was wearing farmer's attire rather than a traditional clown suit. He speculates that the clown was in fact a disguised member of the Derry citizenry or possibly a performer from a nearby carnival, but cannot explain reports out that the clown was seen at several different places at once and that it cast no shadow. 
 Tom Rogan The insane, abusive, violent and sadistic husband of Beverly Marsh. Tom has a very predatory view of women, and he thrives on the control he has over his vulnerable wife. When Beverly tries to leave for Derry, he refuses to let her, whipping her with a belt. Tom is surprised when the normally docile Beverly fights back and almost kills him. He follows Beverly to Derry with the intent of killing her, but is manipulated by It to kidnap Bill's wife, Audra, instead. He later dies from shock after seeing It's true form.
 Alvin Marsh Beverly Marsh's abusive father. Although he is not an alcoholic or drug user, he abuses Bev and her mother and acts misogynistically, though there are times when Alvin is shown to be a loving and caring father to Bev. As an adult, Beverly falls out of contact with her father, and when she returns to Derry in 1985, she discovers he has died five years before.
 Kay McCall Beverly Marsh's close friend, a divorcee and an affluent writer of feminist literature. Beverly turns to her when fleeing her husband Tom. She is brutally assaulted by Tom, who successfully extracts all she knows about his missing wife's whereabouts.
 Audra Philips Denbrough Bill's wife, a famous film actress who bears a marked resemblance to Beverly. She follows Bill to Derry due to her concern over his mental state and is kidnapped by Tom Rogan, who is acting on It's orders. She becomes catatonic after seeing It's Deadlights form, but Bill revives her by taking her on a ride on his childhood bike Silver. She is the only person who has survived after seeing It's true form.
 Zack and Sharon Denbrough Bill and Georgie's father and mother. Initially loving and supportive parents, they become distant from their son and from each other in their grief over Georgie's death, and Bill's hope of regaining their love is one of his biggest motives in fighting It. Zack, an electrician for a hydroelectric firm, has knowledge of Derry's sewer system that becomes instrumental in helping Bill determine where It can be found. Both have died by the time the Losers reunite in 1985.
 Sonia Kaspbrak Eddie's mother. A morbidly obese widow, she has convinced herself that Eddie is seriously ill with multiple illnesses including asthma, despite repeatedly assurances from doctors and teachers that he is basically healthy. She uses her son's health as a way of controlling him, refusing to let him participate in physical activities (which Eddie enjoys) and limiting his contact with friends. Eddie is terrified of upsetting her, but manages to stand up to her after she blames his friends for Henry Bowers breaking his arm. She dies in 1980, by which point she weighs over 400 pounds.
 Maturin the Turtle This ancient turtle is said to have vomited out our Universe when he had a stomach ache. He is kind, wise, loving, gentle, compassionate and benevolent, having a very grandfather-like demeanor when speaking to humans. In 1958, he communicates with Bill Denbrough for a minute while he is under an illusion created by It. Bill pleads for help in defeating It and the Turtle simply gives Bill advice that he must stand by his friends and perform the Ritual of Chüd. During the second Ritual of Chüd in 1985, It tells Bill that the Turtle has since died by "choking on a galaxy", but it is ambiguous as to whether or not this is true.

Development

In 1978, King and his family lived in Boulder, Colorado. One evening, King ventured alone to pick up his car from the repair shop and came across an old wooden bridge, "humped and oddly quaint". Walking along the bridge caused King to recall the story of "Three Billy Goats Gruff", and the idea of transplanting the tale's scenario into a real-life context interested him. King was further inspired by a line by Marianne Moore—“imaginary gardens with real toads in them"—which in his mind came out as "real trolls in imaginary gardens." King would return to the concept two years later and gradually accumulated ideas and thoughts, particularly the concept of weaving the narratives of children and the adults they become. King began writing It in 1980, and finished the book five years later. King found influence in the mythology and history surrounding the construction of the sewer system in Bangor, Maine.

Themes
It thematically focuses on the loss of childhood innocence and questions the difference between necessity and free will. Grady Hendrix of Tor.com described the book as being "about the fact that some doors only open one way, and that while there's an exit out of childhood named sex, there’s no door leading the other way that turns adults back into children". Christopher Lehman-Haupt of The New York Times noted that It "concerns the evil that has haunted America from time to time in the forms of crime, racial and religious bigotry, economic hardship, labor strife and industrial pollution", and that the novel's setting "is a museum filled with the popular culture of the 1950s: brand names, rock 'n' roll songs and stars, the jokes and routines of childhood in that era". James Smythe of The Guardian opined that "Pennywise isn't the novel's biggest terror. The most prominent notions of fear in the novel come from the Losers Club themselves: their home lives, the things that have made them pariahs."

Release
On December 13, 2011, Cemetery Dance published a special limited edition of It for the 25th anniversary of the novel in three editions: an unsigned limited gift edition of 2,750, a signed limited edition of 750, and a signed and lettered limited edition of 52. All three editions are oversized hardcovers, housed in a slipcase or traycase, and feature premium binding materials. This anniversary edition features a new dust jacket illustration by Glen Orbik, as well as numerous interior illustrations by Alan M. Clark and Erin Wells. The book also contains a new afterword by Stephen King discussing his reasons for writing the novel.

Reception and legacy

It received a mostly positive critical reaction when it was released. 

Christopher Lehman-Haupt perceived a lack of justification in Stanley Uris' death and the reunion of the group.

Grady Hendrix described the book as "by turns boring and shocking" and "one of King's most frustrating and perplexing books", and described the behavior of the child characters as idealized and unnatural.

The book's sexual content is controversial among critics and readers. James Smythe considered the book's descriptions of childhood sexuality to be "questionable", and was particularly "shocked" by a scene of the Losers Club engaging in an orgy. Grady Hendrix identified this moment as "in a sense, the heart of the book" and a thematic demonstration of the crossing from childhood to adulthood, and concluded that it is "a way for King to tell kids that sex, even unplanned sex, even sex that's kind of weird, even sex where a girl loses her virginity in the sewer, can be powerful and beautiful if the people having it truly respect and like each other".

The novel has been noted for its exceptional length. Publishers Weekly expressed particular indignation: "Overpopulated and under-characterized, bloated by lazy thought-out philosophizing and theologizing there is simply too much of It."

The character Pennywise has been named by several outlets as one of the scariest clowns in film or pop culture.

In 2003, It was listed at number 144 on the BBC's The Big Read poll—one of three King novels on the list.

Adaptations

In 1990, the novel was adapted into a television miniseries starring Tim Curry as Pennywise the Clown/It, John Ritter as Ben Hanscom, Harry Anderson as Richie Tozier, Richard Masur as Stan Uris, Tim Reid as Mike Hanlon, Annette O'Toole as Beverly Marsh, Richard Thomas as Bill Denbrough, Olivia Hussey as Audra Phillips, Dennis Christopher as Eddie Kaspbrak, and Michael Cole as Henry Bowers. The younger versions of the characters were played by Brandon Crane (Ben), Seth Green (Richie), Ben Heller (Stan), Marlon Taylor (Mike), Emily Perkins (Beverly), Jonathan Brandis (Bill), Adam Faraizl (Eddie), and Jarred Blancard (Henry). The miniseries was directed by Tommy Lee Wallace and scripted by Wallace and Lawrence D. Cohen.

In 1998, the novel was adapted into a television series set in India, starring Lilliput as Pennywise the Clown/Vikram/Woh/It, and Ashutosh Gowarikar (Ashutosh), Mamik Singh (Rahul), Anupam Bhattacharya (Sanjeev), Shreyas Talpade (Young Ashutosh), Parzan Dastur (Young Siddhart), Manoj Joshi (Amit), and Daya Shankar Pandey (Chandu), the series' equivalent of the Losers Club. The series was directed and written by Glen Baretto and Ankush Mohla.

The first of a two-part feature film adaptation, It, was released on September 8, 2017. It is directed by Andy Muschietti, with a screenplay by Chase Palmer, Cary Fukunaga and Gary Dauberman. Instead of a dual narrative, the first film is solely an adaptation of the section that features the characters as children, though the setting has been updated to the late 1980s. It stars Bill Skarsgård as Pennywise and Jaeden Martell as Bill Denbrough. Supporting roles are played by Finn Wolfhard as Richie Tozier, Sophia Lillis as Beverly Marsh, Jack Dylan Grazer as Eddie Kaspbrak, Wyatt Oleff as Stanley Uris, Chosen Jacobs as Mike Hanlon, Jeremy Ray Taylor as Ben Hanscom, Owen Teague as Patrick Hockstetter, Nicholas Hamilton as Henry Bowers, Logan Thompson as Vic Criss and Jake Sim as Belch Huggins.

The second film, It Chapter Two, adapted the "adult" section and updated the setting to the 2010s, specifically 2016. It starred James McAvoy (Bill), Bill Hader (Richie), Jessica Chastain (Beverly), James Ransone (Eddie), Andy Bean (Stan), Isaiah Mustafa (Mike), and Jay Ryan (Ben). Skarsgård reprised the role of Pennywise and the younger actors returned as well. Principal photography wrapped in 2018, and it was released on September 6, 2019.

On March 21, 2022, Variety reported that Muschietti, along with his sister and Jason Fuchs, was developing and executive producing a prequel series for HBO Max, titled Welcome to Derry. The show is said to take place in the 1960s, before the events of It: Chapter One, and will reportedly include the origin story of Pennywise the Clown. Muschietti will direct the first episode, with Fuchs writing all of the episodes for the series.

References

External links 
 
 It at Worlds Without End
 IT Review at Illuminati Blog
 A Chapter-By-Chapter Analysis at It: An Annotated Look at Stephen King

 
1986 American novels
1980s horror novels
Fiction set in 1958
Fiction set in 1985
American horror novels
American novels adapted into films
Domestic violence in fiction
Fiction about shapeshifting
Fratricide in fiction
Homophobia in fiction
Fiction about immortality
Novels about bullying
Novels about friendship
Novels about racism
American novels adapted into television shows
Novels by Stephen King
Novels set in the 1950s
Novels set in the 1980s
Novels set in Maine
Patricide in fiction
Fiction about suicide
Trolls in popular culture
Demon novels
Viking Press books
Warner Bros. Pictures franchises
Novels about clowns
Works about fear
Works about child death